Murder is a British television crime drama series, first broadcast between 29 May and 19 June 2002, that ran for a total of four episodes on BBC Two. The series starred Julie Walters as Angela Maurer, a mother who seeks help from a local journalist after her son, Christopher, is killed the day after his 21st birthday. Each episode focuses on a different character who is somehow linked to the story through Angela, including the journalist, a shopkeeper, a police detective and a witness to the crime itself. The serial was written by playwright Abi Morgan, and directed by Beeban Kidron.

Producer Rebecca de Souza said of the series: "Unless we've had a personal experience of murder we think we understand it because we've all seen investigations on TV or read about them in the newspapers. They are generally presented in a particular way. The focus tends to be on the victim and the police investigation. We wanted to explore the idea that, alongside the immediate family, many people are affected by murder – some in surprising ways." Writer Abi Morgan said of her inspirations for the series. "Their stories were so incredible, there was a strong sense that they had been touched by madness. I wanted to capture the intensity of what they were living through as well as the odd normality of it. Their experiences had a surreal sense about them, but at the same time they had to carry on with their lives. What keeps Angela going is her drive to find out who did it, but, once the investigation is over, there really is nowhere else to go. You just have to live with it."

Walters was awarded a BAFTA television award in 2003 for Best Actress for her role as Angela Maurer. The series averaged around 3 million viewers, with the first episode notably beating ER in the ratings. Notably, the series has never been released on VHS or DVD.

Cast
 Julie Walters as Angela Maurer
 Roland Manookian as Ryan McGuinness
 Nicola Reynolds as Roz Finch
 Paul Higgins as Lee Finch
 Jason Done as Christopher Maurer
 Robert Glenister as Robert Weldon
 David Morrissey as Dave Dewston
 Imelda Staunton as DCI Billie Dory
 Aaron McCusker as DS T.J. Holland
 Elizabeth Rider as DS Wentworth
 Om Puri as Akash Gupta
 Ron Cook as Gareth McGuinness

Episodes

References

External links
 

2002 British television series debuts
2002 British television series endings
2000s British crime television series
2000s British drama television series
BBC television dramas
2000s British television miniseries
English-language television shows
Television series by Tiger Aspect Productions
Television series by Endemol